To Shatter the Sky, subtitled Bomber Airfield at War, is a book and also a BBC television programme of the same name by the military historian, author and screenwriter Bruce Barrymore Halpenny.

The author was already working on the book when he was approached by the BBC to produce a related theme for a history programme, hence the book and programme sharing the same name. The programme was aired on BBC1 in late 1983 and the book launched in early 1984.

The book
The book tells of the day-to-day activities at bomber stations between 1939 and 1945, where the author had meticulously researched his material. It draws extensively on reminiscences from surviving crew members who served at stations such as Waddington, Scampton, Skellingthorpe, Binbrook, Fiskerton, Bardney, Woodhall Spa, and many others.

The book also recalls the stories of those that did not survive or were shot down over enemy territory. A routine flight from RAF Skellingthorpe that turned into a nightmare, and memories of raids on Nuremberg, Düsseldorf and Hamburg, where airmen watched their comrades shot out of the sky by a barrage of deadly enemy flak, all help to paint a picture of what it was like to be an airman based in wartime England.

The TV programme
The book was the basis for a BBC television programme with the same title, which plots the history and present conditions of seven RAF and USAF airfields in the East Midlands. Halpenny scripted the programme and merged wartime film footage with up-to-date shots. The film cameraman was Dick Kursa, the film editor was John Rosser, and the producer was Mike Derby. First shown on BBC1 at 10.15pm on 11 February 1983.

References

History of aviation
1984 non-fiction books
History books about World War II
1983 television specials
World War II television documentaries
Works by Bruce Barrymore Halpenny
British aviation films
BBC television documentaries about history during the 20th Century